The 1987 Singapore Women's Open was a women's tennis tournament played on outdoor hard courts in Kallang, Singapore and was part of the Category 1 tier of the 1987 Virginia Slims World Championship Series. It was the second edition of the Singapore Women's Open and was held from 27 April through 3 May 1987. Third-seeded Anne Minter won the singles title.

Finals

Singles
 Anne Minter defeated  Barbara Gerken 6–4, 6–1
 It was Minter's 2nd singles title of the year and of her career.

Doubles
 Anna-Maria Fernandez /  Julie Richardson defeated  Barbara Gerken /  Heather Ludloff 6–1, 6–4
 It was Fernandez' 2nd doubles title of the year and the 5th and last of her career. It was Richardson's 2nd doubles title of the year and the 4th of her career.

References

External links
 ITF tournament edition details

Singapore Open
WTA Singapore Open
1987 in Singaporean sport
Women's sports competitions in Singapore